ABTL0812 (α-hydroxylinoleic acid) is a small-molecule, experimental cancer drug being developed by Ability Pharmaceuticals.

History 

In 2015, Ability announced that it had received orphan drug designation (ODD) for pediatric cancer neuroblastoma from the European Medical Agency (EMA) and the US Food and Drug Administration (FDA). Also in 2016 a preclinical study confirmed that ABTL0812 was well tolerated.
In December 2016 the company announced ODD for the treatment of pancreatic cancer.

Mechanism of action 

One mechanism of action is the activation of the PPAR receptors and the TRIB3 gene, leading to inhibition of the Akt/mTOR pathway. This pathway is excessively activated in most human cancers, supporting tumor growth. It is a principal target of various new anti-tumour drugs. Tumor cells are killed viva autophagy, rather than apoptosis.

ABTL0812 activates the PPAR receptors, inducing TRIB3 over-expression. TRIB3 binds to the Akt oncogene and inhibits the Akt/mTOR axis.

Clinical trials 
ABTL0812 showed efficacy in Phase I clinical trials in patients with advanced cancer, with low toxicity and high tolerability.

References 

Experimental cancer drugs
Alpha hydroxy acids
Fatty acids